Bani is a town in far eastern Gambia. It is located in Kantora District in the Upper River Division.  As of 2008, it has an estimated population of 1,177.

References

Populated places in the Gambia